Triton and Nereid may refer to:

Art
Triton and Nereid (Sussmann-Hellborn), also known as Meeresidylle, painting by Louis Sussmann-Hellborn (missing since 1945)
Triton and Nereid (Böcklin), also known as Meeresidylle, 1877 painting by Arnold Böcklin
Triton and Nereid (Gauguin), painting by Jean René Gauguin
Tritons and Nereids, 1500 painting by Piero di Cosimo

Other
Triton and Nereid, two Moons of Neptune

See also
Triton (disambiguation)
Nereid (disambiguation)